Gurney Airport  is an airport serving Alotau in the Milne Bay Province of Papua New Guinea (PNG).

The airport is a single runway general aviation facility. In December 2008, the PNG Minister for Transport and Civil Aviation, Don Polye announced that aviation company SkyAirWorld had been granted permission to operate direct flights from Cairns, Australia to Gurney.

History
Built by the US Army 96th Engineer General Service Regiment, Company E of 46th Engineer General Service Regiment and No. 6 Mobile Works Squadron RAAF during World War II. Named after Charles Raymond Gurney an Australian aviator. Taxiways and revetments extended off both sides of the runways. Known as Fall River Aerodrome and No. 1 Strip. The airfield was named Gurney Field on 14 September 1942 in honour of Royal Australian Air Force Squadron Leader C.R. Gurney, who was killed in an aircraft crash.

The airfield was reopened in early 1966, as a part of the Australian colonial policy of having each of the provincial capitals served by daily flights. The last Sunbird PBY service to Samarai was in January of that year. A number of other WWII airfields were reopened in the area, such as Vivigani Airfield and Misima (April 1964). Several airlines then operated daily passenger and freight services into Gurney, using larger aircraft.

Allied Units based at Gurney Field
 8th Fighter Group (18 September 1942 – February 1943)
 Headquarters, 35th Fighter Squadron, P-40 Warhawk, 36th Fighter Squadron, (P-39 Airacobra, P-400, and P-40 Warhawk), 80th Fighter Squadron P-38 Lightning, P-39 Airacobra.
 418th Night Fighter Squadron, (V Fighter Command), (2–22 November 1943), P-61 Black Widow
 421st Night Fighter Squadron, (V Fighter Command), (4–27 January 1944), P-61 Black Widow
 No. 32 Squadron RAAF - (Lockheed Hudson)
 No. 75 Squadron RAAF (P-40)
 No. 76 Squadron RAAF (P-40)
 No. 100 Squadron RAAF
 No. 10 Repair and Salvage Unit RAAF
 A Troop, 9 Battery, 2/3 Australian Light Anti-aircraft Regiment

Facilities

Airlines and destinations

See also

 USAAF in the Southwest Pacific
Naval Base Milne Bay

References

External links
 
 
Pacific War Airfields Project

Airports in Papua New Guinea
Airfields of the United States Army Air Forces in Papua New Guinea
Milne Bay Province
Airfields of the United States Army Air Forces Air Transport Command in the South West Pacific Theater
Airports established in 1942
1942 establishments in the Territory of Papua
World War II airfields in Papua New Guinea
Populated places in Milne Bay Province
Gurney Airport
Papua New Guinea in World War II
Southern Region, Papua New Guinea